Gravina was a  unprotected cruiser of the Spanish Navy.

Technical characteristics
Gravina was built by the Thames Ironworks & Shipbuilding & Engineering Co. Ltd. at Leamouth, London in the United Kingdom. Her keel was laid in 1881. She had one rather tall funnel. She had an iron hull and was rigged as a barque. She and the lead ship of the class, also built in the United Kingdom, were differently armed and slightly faster than the final six ships of the class, all of which were built in Spain.

Operational history
Not long after her completion, Gravina was based in the Philippines. She had a short life, sinking in a typhoon on 10 July 1884 with the loss of two officers and seven crew.

References

Chesneau, Roger, and Eugene M. Kolesnik, Eds. Conway's All The World's Fighting Ships 1860–1905. New York, New York: Mayflower Books Inc., 1979. .
Nofi, Albert A. The Spanish–American War, 1898. Conshohocken, Pennsylvania:Combined Books, Inc., 1996. .

External links
The Spanish–American War Centennial Website: Don Antonio de Ulloa
Department of the Navy: Naval Historical Center: Online Library of Selected Images: Spanish Navy Ships: Conde del Venadito (Cruiser, 1888–1902)

Velasco-class cruisers
Ships built in Leamouth
Maritime incidents in July 1884
Shipwrecks in the South China Sea
1881 ships